The Eurovision Song Contest 1968 was the 13th edition of the annual Eurovision Song Contest. Organised by the European Broadcasting Union (EBU) and host broadcaster British Broadcasting Corporation (BBC), the contest was held at Royal Albert Hall on 6 April 1968, and was hosted by Katie Boyle for the third time. It was notably also the first time that the contest was broadcast in colour.

Seventeen countries participated in the contest, the same countries that had participated the previous year.

This was Spain's first victory - and their first ever top five placing - in the contest. With her winning reprise, she became the first winner to perform part of her song in English, in addition to the original version.

Location 

The contest was held at the Royal Albert Hall in London. The Royal Albert Hall is known for hosting the world's leading artists from several performance genres, sports, award ceremonies, the annual summer Proms concerts and other events since its opening in 1871, and has become one of the United Kingdom's most treasured and distinctive buildings.

Format 
1968 was the first time that the Eurovision Song Contest was broadcast in colour. The countries that broadcast it in colour were France, Germany, the Netherlands, Norway, Switzerland, Sweden and the United Kingdom, although in the UK it was broadcast as an encore presentation in colour on BBC Two the next day. All of Eastern Europe as well as Tunisia broadcast the contest as well.

Prior to the contest, the bookmakers were sure of another British victory, as the English singer Cliff Richard, who was already dominating the music charts at that time, was hotly tipped as the favourite to win, but in the end he lost out to Spain's song by a margin of just one point.

Originally Massiel's song La La La was supposed to be sung by Spanish singer Joan Manuel Serrat who wanted to perform the song in Catalan. At the request of Spanish officials, however, Juan Manuel was replaced by Massiel who sang the same song in Castilian (Spanish).

Participating countries 

All countries that had participated in 1967 also participated in 1968.

Conductors 
Each performance had a maestro who conducted the orchestra.

 
 Dolf van der Linden
 Henri Segers
 
 André Borly
 Mario Robbiani
 Michel Colombier
 Mats Olsson
 Ossi Runne
 Alain Goraguer
 Giancarlo Chiaramello
 Norrie Paramor
 Øivind Bergh
 Noel Kelehan
 
 Horst Jankowski
 Miljenko Prohaska

Returning artists 
Bold indicates a previous winner.

Participants and results

Detailed voting results 

Due to a misunderstanding by the hostess, Katie Boyle, Switzerland were erroneously awarded 3 points by Yugoslavia, instead of 2. The scrutineer asked for the Yugoslav votes from TV Skopje to be announced a second time.

Spokespersons 

Listed below is the order in which votes were cast during the 1968 contest along with the spokesperson who was responsible for announcing the votes for their respective country.

 Maria Manuela Furtado
 Warry van Kampen
 André Hagon
 
 TBC
 
 TBC
 
 
 
 Mike Bongiorno
 Michael Aspel
 
 Gay Byrne
 Ramón Rivera
 
 Snežana Lipkovska-Hadžinaumova

Broadcasts 

Each participating broadcaster was required to relay the contest via its networks. Non-participating EBU member broadcasters were also able to relay the contest as "passive participants". Broadcasters were able to send commentators to provide coverage of the contest in their own native language and to relay information about the artists and songs to their television viewers.

Known details on the broadcasts in each country, including the specific broadcasting stations and commentators are shown in the tables below. In addition to the participating countries, the contest was also reportedly broadcast in Tunisia, and in Bulgaria, Czechoslovakia, East Germany, Hungary, Poland, Romania and the Soviet Union via Intervision.

Incidents

Spanish artist replacement
Originally Spain entered Joan Manuel Serrat to sing "La, la, la", but his demand to sing in Catalan was an affront to the Francoist State dictatorship. Therefore, Massiel, who was on tour in Mexico, was brought in as a late replacement. In just two weeks, she had to rush back to Spain, learn the song, record it in several languages, travel to Paris to get a dress and go to London for rehearsals. She sang the song in the contest in Spanish with the new arrangement made to fit her. In her winning reprise, she performed part of her song in English, in addition to the original version, becoming the first winner to do so.

Vote rigging allegations
In May 2008, a documentary by Spanish film-maker Montse Fernández Villa, 1968. Yo viví el mayo español, centred on the effects of May 1968 in Francoist Spain, and alleged that the 1968 Eurovision Song Contest was rigged by the Spanish caudillo Francisco Franco, who would have sent state television officials across Europe offering cash and promising to buy television series and contract unknown artists. The allegation was based on a testimony by journalist José María Íñigo, a TVE employee at the time, who claimed the rigging was common knowledge and suggested that Spanish record label representatives offered to release albums by Bulgarian and Czech artists (neither Bulgaria nor Czechoslovakia were members of the European Broadcasting Union at the time, though in the 1968 contest, Austria was represented by Karel Gott, who was from Czechoslovakia.).

The documentary claimed that the contest should in fact have been won by the United Kingdom's entry – "Congratulations" performed by Cliff Richard – which finished second by one vote. Massiel, the performer of the winning entry, was outraged by the allegations, and claimed that if there had been fixes, "other singers, who were more keen on Francoist Spain, would have benefited". José María Iñigo, author of the statement in the documentary, personally apologized to Massiel and said that he had repeated a widespread rumour. Both Massiel and Iñigo accused television channel La Sexta, broadcaster of the documentary, of manufacturing the scandal.

Notes

References

External links 

 
1968
Music festivals in the United Kingdom
1968 in music
1968 in London
April 1968 events in the United Kingdom
Events at the Royal Albert Hall
Francoist Spain